This is a list of monuments in Rustavi, Georgia, which are listed on the Ministry of Culture and Monument Protection of Georgia.

List

|}

See also
 List of monuments in Georgia

References

Rustavi
Rustavi